USS S-20 (SS-125) was a first-group (S-1 or "Holland") S-class submarine of the United States Navy in commission from 1922 to 1945. She saw duty in both the Atlantic and Pacific Oceans, and during World War II operated off New England.

Construction and commissioning
S-20′s keel was laid down on 15 August 1918 by the Bethlehem Shipbuilding Corporation's Fore River Shipyard at Quincy, Massachusetts. She was launched on 9 June 1920, sponsored by Miss Anne Claggett Zell, and commissioned on 22 November 1922.

Modifications
S-20 was rebuilt in 1924, with a larger bow similar to that of the V-1 class to improve seakeeping and blisters on the upper hull to hold more fuel, but this modification was not repeated on any other members of her class.

S-20 was also used as an experimental engine test vessel, with a new high-speed geared-drive  MAN diesel engine replacing her starboard engine in 1931. In 1932, this new engine was replaced by a prototype diesel-electric plant. This was a MAN-type  16-cylinder engine running at even higher speed, driving an electrical generator built by the Electric Boat Company and designated 16VM1. Electricity produced by the generator was used to drive a high-speed electric motor geared to the shaft; there was no direct connection between the diesel engine and the shaft. Diesel-electric propulsion was then adopted for many U.S. submarines through World War II, starting with the 1932 Porpoise class; other navies did not follow suit until after World War II.

Service history

Interwar period
In addition to duty along the northeastern coast of the United States while based at New London, Connecticut, from 1922 to 1929, S-20 visited Coco Solo in the Panama Canal Zone in March 1923; served at Saint Thomas, United States Virgin Islands, in February 1924; and operated in the Panama Canal area from January through April 1926. S-20 visited Kingston, Jamaica, from 20 to 28 March 1927, and served again in the Panama Canal area from 17 April 1929 to November 1930. Departing Coco Solo on 7 November 1930, S-20 arrived at Pearl Harbor, Hawaii, on 7 December 1930. Following duty there, she departed on 20 February 1932, and from March 1932 to April 1933 served at Mare Island, California. Later, she operated mainly at San Diego, California, into 1934.

Departing San Diego on 15 March 1934, S-20 returned to New London on 28 October 1934. From then until December 1941, she operated there as part of a test and evaluation division. During this period, she visited Guantanamo, Cuba, from February to March 1938; served in the Panama Canal area from January to March 1939; and visited Guantanamo again in February 1940. Her commanding officer from 1936 to 1937 was Lieutenant (later Captain) John P. Cromwell, a future posthumous Medal of Honor recipient for his actions aboard  in 1943. From 1941 to 1942 her commander was another future Medal of Honor recipient, Lieutenant (later Commander) Samuel David Dealey.

World War II
From December 1941 to July 1945, S-20 continued to operate from New London. Her operations were off New England and often included training activities at Casco Bay, Maine.

Disposal
Departing New London on 2 July 1945, S-20 was decommissioned on 16 July at Philadelphia, Pennsylvania. Her name was struck from the Naval Vessel Register on 25 July. She was sold on 22 January 1946 to North American Smelting Company, Philadelphia for scrapping.

References

United States S-class submarines
World War II submarines of the United States
Ships built in Quincy, Massachusetts
1920 ships